Rachel Goodrich is an American musician from Miami, Florida. Her music has been described as an "eclectic blend of vaudeville-inspired indie pop, swing-jazz and country-folk."

Her first album, Tinker Toys, was self-released in 2008 to which the New York Times dubbed her as a "queen of the Miami indie rock scene".

The second, self-titled album was produced by Grammy-nominated music producer Greg Wells.

Goodrich's song, "Light Bulb", was featured in an episode of the TV series Weeds, and the song also features in a Crayola commercial advertisement. A remix of the song was made by Awesome New Republic and used on the BT Infinity – "Light Streams" advert.

The songs, "Light Bulb", "Piggy Bank" & "Ukulele Water" were featured in the MTV show My Life As Liz.

Discography

Albums
 Tinker Toys (2008)
 Rachel Goodrich (2011)
 Apple Juice + Whiskey (2012) (under Rachel Hoodrich)
 Baby, Now We're Even (2014)

EPs
 Homemade

References

External links
 Website
 

American indie pop musicians
Living people
Musicians from Miami
Year of birth missing (living people)